Charlotte Hollings is an American rower. In the 1994 World Rowing Championships she won a gold medal in the women's lightweight coxless four event.

References

American female rowers
World Rowing Championships medalists for the United States
Year of birth missing (living people)
Living people
21st-century American women